The City and University Library of Osijek is the city library of Osijek and the central library of the University of Osijek. The library's collection contains over 422,790 volumes and circulates 325, 836 items per year, making it one of the biggest library in Slavonia and one of the bigger ones in Croatia.

History 
The National Committee of Osijek established the Osijek City Library on February 8, 1949. In 1957 library was moved into former House of Gillming-Hengl, building on European Avenue, where library is located today.  The name was changed to The City and University Library of Osijek in 1975 when the University of Osijek was established.

References

External links 
 Official web-site 

1949 establishments in Yugoslavia
Academic libraries in Croatia
Public libraries
Buildings and structures in Osijek
Culture in Osijek
Libraries established in 1949